Feohanagh is a village in the parish of Mahoonagh, south west County Limerick in Ireland. It is the only village on that road.

References

Towns and villages in County Limerick